The Carey Exempted Village School District is a public school district in Wyandot County, Ohio, United States, based in Carey, Ohio.

Schools

The Carey Exempted Village School District has one elementary school and one high school. The high school and elementary school were demolished on July 25, 2016. A new combination of the high school and elementary school was opened off of South Vance Street for the 2016–2017 school year.

Elementary school
Carey Elementary

High school
Carey High School

References

External links

School districts in Ohio
Education in Wyandot County, Ohio